Amanda Coetzer and Lori McNeil were the defending champions, but McNeil did not compete this year. Coetzer teamed up with Jessica Steck and lost in first round to sisters Adriana Serra Zanetti and Antonella Serra Zanetti.

Ai Sugiyama and Elena Tatarkova won the title by defeating Melissa Middleton and Brie Rippner 6–4, 2–6, 6–0 in the final.

Seeds

Draw

Draw

References
 Official results archive (ITF)
 Official results archive (WTA)

2002 Kroger St. Jude International
2002 WTA Tour